Dischidia nummularia is an epiphytic climbing plant that belongs to the genus Dischidia. It has tiny, opposite lens-shaped leaves, and is frequently seen on the trunks of trees. In the wild it is found in India, China, Indonesia, Laos, Thailand, Vietnam, Myanmar, Malaysia, and Australia.

References

Dischidia